Zayar Thaw (also called U Phyo Zayar Thaw or Zeya Thaw; 26 March 1981 – 23 July 2022) was a Burmese politician and hip-hop artist who was detained for the perceived anti-government messages of his lyrics. Amnesty International named him a prisoner of conscience. He was a member of Pyithu Hluttaw, the Lower House of the Burmese parliament. He, along with opposition leader Aung San Suu Kyi, were elected to the lower house on 1 April 2012. 

In November 2021 he was arrested by the Myanmar military junta and was sentenced to death in January 2022. In June 2022, the junta announced that his execution was imminent. On 23 July 2022, he and three other democratic activists (among them Kyaw Min Yu) were executed.

Early life and education

Zayar Thaw was born on 26 March 1981 in Yangon, Myanmar to Mya Thaw, a former rector and his wife Khin Win May, a dentist. He attended high school at BEHS No. 6 Botahtaung. He enrolled at the University of Pharmacy, Mandalay in 1999, then switched to distance education at the Yadanabon University in 2000, and graduated with B.A (English) in 2003.

Hip hop career
In 2000, Zayar Thaw's band Acid released Burma's first hip-hop album. Despite predictions of failure by many in the Burmese music industry, the album, Beginning, remained in the number one position of the Burmese charts for more than two months. A Democratic Voice of Burma reporter described his music as blending a "combative, angry style with indigenous poeticism". The band's repertoire has been said to contain many "thinly veiled attacks on the regime". The Independent stated that while the band "focused on the mundane, their lyrics inevitably touched on the hardships of life in Burma, drawing them into dangerous territory."

Zayar Thaw also became known early on for his social activism. At one concert, he teamed with poets Saw Wai and Aung Way to raise money for a charity for HIV-positive orphans founded by the comedian Zarganar. Along with fellow rapper Nge Nge, Zayar Thaw also visited Zarganar's orphanages to help teach English to the children.

Generation Wave activism and arrest
Zayar Thaw was one of four founding members of Generation Wave, a youth movement opposed to the State Peace and Development Council, Burma's military rulers. The group was founded on 9 October 2007, following the anti-government protests popularly known as the Saffron Revolution, and used graffiti and pamphlets to spread pro-democracy messages. Zayar Thaw reportedly developed one of the group's more widespread campaigns, bumper stickers reading "Change New Government" to apply to cars carrying "CNG" stickers (for "compressed natural gas"). The group also circulated anti-government films, including Rambo, in which the titular character battles Tatmadaw (Burmese military) soldiers in Karen State. The film had been banned by the government for portraying the SPDC and its soldiers in a negative light.

As of February 2010, about thirty members of the group had been imprisoned, including Zayar Thaw, who was arrested at a Yangon restaurant with friends on 12 March 2008. In April, Zayar Thaw's Acid co-founder Yan Yan Chan was also arrested.

Trial and imprisonment
Zayar Thaw was allegedly beaten during his interrogation. On 20 November 2008, he was sentenced to five years' imprisonment for breaking State Law and Order Restoration Council Law No. 6/88, "illegal organizing under the Unlawful Association Act". Amnesty International described this statute as "a vaguely worded law whose sweeping provisions can be interpreted as making it illegal to set up any kind of organization". He was given an additional year's imprisonment for possession of foreign currency, as he had been carrying approximately $20 USD in Thai baht, Singapore dollars, and Malaysian ringgit at the time of his arrest.

Before his sentencing, Zayar Thaw told reporters, "I feel sad, but not because of my imprisonment... I feel sad for the future of our country and people when I think about these facts. These words come from my heart. I wish to say to people, 'Have the courage to reject the things you don’t like, and even if you don’t dare to openly support the right thing, don’t support the wrong thing.' " His sentence was condemned by Amnesty International, who named him a prisoner of conscience and called for his immediate release.

Release and political career

He served out his sentence at Kawthaung prison and was released on 17 May 2011. In August 2011, Zayar Thaw was banned by the Mingala Taungnyunt Township Police Station from performing at a stage show on Kandawgyi Lake's Hmyawzin Island.

He was a member of the National League for Democracy. In the 2012 Myanmar by-elections, he contested the Pobbathiri Township constituency for a seat in the House of Representatives, the country's lower house, and won the seat that Tin Aung Myint Oo vacated in 2011.

In the 2015 Myanmar general election, he contested the Zabuthiri Township constituency and won a House of Representatives seat.

Execution 
In November 2021, he was arrested by the Myanmar military junta and charged with planning attacks on junta targets under the Counterterrorism Law and the Public Property Protection Act. In January 2022, he was sentenced to death. The junta announced that his execution was imminent in June 2022, and on 23 July 2022, it was announced that Zayar Thaw had been executed alongside three others, including democracy activist Kyaw Min Yu.

Reactions 
The organizations Human Rights Watch and Amnesty International reacted with shock. The Asia director of Human Rights Watch, Elaine Pearson, spoke of politically motivated trials and pointed out that the families of the condemned had only learned of the executions through media reports.

The German government strongly condemned the first executions in Myanmar in more than three decades. The United Nations Special Rapporteur on the situation of human rights in Myanmar, Tom Andrews, tweeted that he was "shocked" by the news: "U.N. Member States must honor their lives by making this heinous act a turning point in the world's response to this crisis." On 28 July 2022, the G7 foreign ministers of Canada, France, Germany, Italy, Japan, the United Kingdom, and the United States of America, and the European Union released a statement strongly condemning Phyo Zeya Thaw's execution by the military junta.

Personal life
He was married to Thazin Nyunt Aung, a fellow rapper.

In popular culture
In End Game: Union Multiplayer, Multiplayer shooter game from Shoot and Support, the character Zayar Thaw is created for honour of Zayar Thaw as well as a memorial for justice.

References

1981 births
2022 deaths
People executed by Myanmar
People executed by Myanmar by hanging
Amnesty International prisoners of conscience held by Myanmar
Burmese democracy activists
Burmese prisoners and detainees
21st-century Burmese male singers
Burmese hip hop musicians
National League for Democracy politicians
People from Yangon
Members of Pyithu Hluttaw